Klutz  may refer to:

Klutz Press, a publishing company
Klütz (or "Kluetz") is a surname and a town in the Nordwestmecklenburg district, Mecklenburg-Western Pomerania, Germany
Captain Klutz, comic strip superhero parody of Mad Magazine

See also 
Kluttz, a surname